Ban Mi station is a railway station located in Ban Mi Subdistrict, Ban Mi District, Lop Buri. It is on the Northern Line of the State Railway of Thailand. The station opened on 31 October 1905 as part of the Northern Line extension from Lopburi to Pak Nam Pho.

Train services
 Rapid 102 Chiang Mai-Bangkok
 Rapid 105/106 Bangkok-Sila At-Bangkok
 Rapid 109 Bangkok-Chiang Mai
 Rapid 111/112 Bangkok-Den Chai-Bangkok
 Ordinary 201/202 Bangkok-Phitsanulok-Bangkok
 Ordinary 207/208 Bangkok-Nakhon Sawan-Bangkok
 Ordinary 209/210 Bangkok-Ban Takhli-Bangkok
 Ordinary 211/212 Bangkok-Taphan Hin-Bangkok
 Local 401/402 Lop Buri-Phitsanulok-Lop Buri

References 
 Ichirō, Kakizaki (2010). Ōkoku no tetsuro: tai tetsudō no rekishi. Kyōto: Kyōtodaigakugakujutsushuppankai. 
 Otohiro, Watanabe (2013). Tai kokutetsu yonsenkiro no tabi: shasō fūkei kanzen kiroku. Tōkyō: Bungeisha. 

Railway stations in Thailand
Railway stations opened in 1905
1905 establishments in Siam